is a railway station on the  Nanao Line in the city of Nanao, Ishikawa, Japan, operated by the private railway operator Noto Railway.

Lines

Station layout
The station consists of two opposed side platforms connected by a footbridge. The station is staffed.

Platforms

History
Tatsuruhama Station opened on 31 October 1928. With the privatization of Japanese National Railways (JNR) on 1 April 1987, the station came under the control of JR West. On 1 September 1991, the section of the Nanao Line from Nanao to Anamizu was separated from JR West into the Noto Railway.

Passenger statistics
In fiscal 2015, the station was used by an average of 210 passengers daily (boarding passengers only).

Surrounding area

 Former Tsuruhama Town Hall
Tsuruhama Post Office

See also
 List of railway stations in Japan

References

External links

Railway stations in Ishikawa Prefecture
Railway stations in Japan opened in 1928
Nanao Line
Nanao, Ishikawa